Marie-Claude Blais is a Canadian politician, who was elected to the Legislative Assembly of New Brunswick in the 2010 provincial election. She represented the electoral district of Moncton North as a member of the Progressive Conservatives from 2010 to 2014.

Blais is a graduate in law from the Université de Moncton and the Université de Sherbrooke, and has practised law for 12 years. She has been a member of the Progressive Conservative Party of New Brunswick since 1997, and served as party executive director and legal counsel for several years.

In addition to her professional activities, Blais is active in the Moncton community, and involved in parish and local community organizations. She has also participated in the organization of the campaign to finance the renovation of Aberdeen Cultural Centre, an important site of Acadian cultural life in the region.

She was sworn in on October 12, 2010 to the positions of Attorney-General and Minister of Justice and Consumer Affairs of New Brunswick in the government of David Alward. She was defeated in the 2014 general election by Liberal Chris Collins.

In May 2015, she was appointed Justice of the Court of the Queens Bench of New Brunswick.

References

Progressive Conservative Party of New Brunswick MLAs
Women MLAs in New Brunswick
Acadian people
Lawyers in New Brunswick
Living people
Members of the Executive Council of New Brunswick
People from Moncton
Attorneys General of New Brunswick
Women government ministers of Canada
Judges in New Brunswick
Canadian women judges
21st-century Canadian politicians
21st-century Canadian women politicians
Year of birth missing (living people)